Xylopagurus is a genus of hermit crabs within the family Paguridae. There are currently 4 species assigned ot the genus.

Species 

 Xylopagurus cancellarius 
 Xylopagurus rectus 
 Xylopagurus tayrona 
 Xylopagurus tenuis

References 

Hermit crabs
Decapod genera